Ardour is a hard disk recorder and digital audio workstation application that runs on Linux, macOS, FreeBSD and Microsoft Windows. Its primary author is Paul Davis, who was also responsible for the JACK Audio Connection Kit. It is intended as a digital audio workstation suitable for professional use.

It is free software, released under the terms of the GPL-2.0-or-later.

Features

Recording 
Ardour's recording abilities are limited by only the hardware it is run on; there are no built-in limits in its capabilities. When recording on top of existing media, it can perform latency compensation, positioning recorded material where it was intended to be when recording it. Monitoring options include self-monitoring, external hardware support (dependent on sound card support), and specialized hardware support (e.g. JACK Audio Connection Kit). Self-monitoring makes it possible to apply plug-in effects while recording. Using the JACK audio, Ardour can record concurrently from both the audio card and compatible software.

Mixing 
Ardour supports an arbitrary number of tracks and buses through an "anything to anywhere" routing system. All gain, panning and plug-in parameters can be automated. All sample data is mixed and maintained internally in 32-bit floating point format.

Editing 
Ardour supports dragging, trimming, splitting and time-stretching recorded regions with sample-level resolution, and supports layer regions. It includes a crossfade editor and beat detection, unlimited undo/redo, and a "snapshot" feature for saving the current state of a session to a file.

Mastering 
Ardour can be used as an audio mastering environment. Its integration with the JACK Audio Connection Kit makes it possible to use mastering tools such as JAMin. Its mixer's output can be sent to third-party audio processing software for processing and/or recording. It can also export TOC and CUE files for creating audio CDs.

Compatibility 
Ardour attempts to adhere to industry standards, such as SMPTE/MTC, Broadcast Wave Format, MIDI Machine Control and XML.

It has been tested on Linux, x86-64, x86, PowerPC and ARM (for at least version 3) architectures; Solaris, macOS on Intel and PowerPC, Windows on Intel architectures and FreeBSD. It takes advantage of all of these systems' multiprocessor, multicore SMP and real-time features. 

Pre-built binaries of Ardour 6.x are available for Linux, macOS and Windows.

Plug-ins 
Ardour relies on plug-ins for many features, from audio effects processing to dynamic control. It supports the following plugin format and platform combinations: LV2 on Linux, FreeBSD, macOS and Windows; AudioUnits on macOS; Steinberg's VST2 on Linux, macOS and Windows; LADSPA on Linux, FreeBSD, macOS and Windows. It is theoretically possible to use plugins created for Windows in the VST2 format on Linux with the help of Wine, but the project team does not recommend it.
Since version 6.5, it also supports VST3 plugins on all supported platforms. Unlike most modern 64-bit DAW's, Ardour does not run 32bit VST's natively

Import and export 
Ardour can export whole sessions or parts of sessions, and import audio clips into sessions from more than 30 different audio file formats, using its built-in audio file database manager, or directly from an ordinary file browser.

Supporting companies and future 
The SAE Institute provided corporate support for Ardour until February 2009, an initiative for providing a more integrated experience on Mac OS X and the development of a simpler version for students and others new to audio processing.

Solid State Logic employed Paul Davis to work full-time on Ardour during the development of version 2, until the end of 2006.

Harrison Audio Consoles has supported the Ardour project since early 2005. Harrison's "Mixbus" DAW and their destructive film dubber, the Xdubber, are based on Ardour. Mixbus extends Ardour to add Harrison's own DSP and a more console-like workflow. The Xdubber is a customizable platform for enterprise-class digital audio workstation (DAW) users.

Waves Audio privately supported Ardour development in 2009. It also developed the Waves Track Live software in collaboration with Ardour developers
, with most of the source code changes becoming part of Ardour's codebase.

See also 

 JACK Audio Connection Kit, a real-time low latency audio server.
 Comparison of digital audio editors
 Comparison of free software for audio
 Linux audio software
 List of free and open source digital audio workstation software
 List of music software

References

Articles

External links
Official website
Manual 

2005 software
Audio editing software that uses GTK
Audio software that uses GTK 
Audio software with JACK support
Cross-platform free software
Digital audio editors for Linux
Digital audio workstation software
Free audio editors
Free music software
Free software programmed in C++
MacOS audio editors
Software that uses GStreamer